Anarchism is a book-length survey of anarchism written by David Miller and published by J. M. Dent in 1984.

Further reading 

 
 
 
 
 
 

1984 non-fiction books
Books about anarchism
English-language books
J. M. Dent books